Duell may refer to:

People
Charles Holland Duell (1850–1920), New York politician and federal judge
Holland S. Duell (1881–1942), New York politician, and decorated World War I hero
R. Holland Duell (1824–1891), US congressman from New York
Chad Duell (born 1987), American actor
Joseph Duell (1956–1986), American dancer and choreographer
Randall Duell (1903–1992)
William Duell (1923–2011)

Companies
Duell, Sloan and Pearce, a former publishing company located in New York

Other
Duell (game), a board game

See also
Deuel (disambiguation)
Duel (disambiguation)